S. Ramakrishnan is a writer from Tamil Nadu, India.  He is a full-time writer who has been active over the last 27 years in diverse areas of Tamil literature like short stories, novels, plays, children's literature and translations. He has written and published 9 novels, 20 collections of short stories, 3 plays, 21 books for children, 3 books of translation, 24 collections of articles, 10 books on world cinema, 16 books on world literature including seven of his lectures, 3 books on Indian history, 3 on painting and 4 edited volumes including a Reader on his own works. He also has 2 collections of interviews to his credit. He won the Sahitya Akademi award in 2018 in Tamil language category for his novel Sanjaaram.

Writing career 
About his first book he says: "I was not a writer when my first book 'veLiyil oruvan' was published. Until then I was just writing whatever I wanted to write, but I was not a writer; even after my first book came out…" and "…but now I know the direction, purpose and strength of the written word. I didn’t know that then. It is like how a child with a camera takes pictures of whatever she sees… I was like that child."

His short stories and articles have been translated and published in English, Malayalam, Hindi, Bengali, Telugu, Kannada and French.

His novel Upa Paandavam, written after a deep research into Mahabharata, was selected as the best novel in Tamil. It was widely well received by the readers.

The novel Nedum Kuruthi, which spoke of the dark and tragic existential experiences of the tribe of oppressed people cruelly stamped as criminal tribe by the British, secured the Gnanavaani award for the Best Novel.

His novel Yaamam, written with Chennai city's three hundred years history as back drop, is another widely appreciated creation.

His Urupasi is a novel that conveys the stirring mental agonies of a young man who was unemployed because he took his degree majoring in Tamil language.

He became a celebrated author to lakhs of readers through his series of articles like Thunai Ezhuthu, Desandhri, Kathavilaasam, Kelvikuri and Siridhu Velicham which appeared in the highly circulated Tamil weekly, Ananda Vikatan. He is the first writer in Tamil to have created a broad circle of readers for his columns. The compilation book of the articles, Thunai Ezhuthu, has created a new history by selling almost a lakh of copies.

Writing style 
His short stories are noted for their modern story-telling style in Tamil. He says in an interview: "As a storyteller, it’s vital that I observe people, their mannerisms and keep myself aware of present trends…” and “…I keep myself surrounded by youngsters who I learn a lot from. I think it is such company that keeps me revitalised to write more and more stories".

He explains the magical nature of his stories quite simply – "The reason why my stories have a magical aspect is because I am unable to separate Magic from Realism."

Literary activism 

A great story-teller, he has organized over thirty story-telling camps for school children, all over Tamil Nadu. He has organized a special story-telling camp for children with dyslexia-related learning disabilities.

He says in an interview: "We have a rich tradition of PaaNans and Koothars going around places singing and creating poetry in the Sangam period. I am just a modern day PaaNan who goes to places, meets people, talks to them and tells their stories."

He had, as Editor, brought out the literary publication, Atcharam for five long years.

His website www.sramakrishnan.com serves as a resource for serious literature for young readers. It has become an important website where contemporary literary innovations, world literature and world cinema congregate in a fertile ambience. It has secured 5 million visits from readers all over the world.

Publishing House 'Desanthiri' 
In December 2017, he started his own publishing house in the name of one of his most famous books, Desanthiri. It was started to publish his own works, old ones which are not in print at present as well as his upcoming works.

Films and other adoptions (contributions in movie and theatre performances) 
A connoisseur of world cinema, he has compiled an introductory compendium on world cinema with thousand pages called Ulaga Cinema. He has written ten important books on cinema such as Ayal Cinema, Pather Panchali, Chithirangalin Vichithirangal and Paesa Therindha Nizhalgal. Irul Inithu Oli Inithu, Chaplinudan Pesungal.

He has organized screenplay writing camps for short film directors and students of cinema creation in important cities like Chennai, Coimbatore, etc.

His collection of 9 plays, Aravaan (Uyirmmai Publications), 3 plays, Sindhubaadhin Manaivi (Kayalkavin Publications) and Sooriyanai sutrum boomi (translated plays, Kayalkavin Publications) create new possibilities for theater space on facing power, breaking up historical and cultural images and focusing on psychological eccentricities. These plays have received good appreciation while they were staged and have been performed at the national drama festival of Sangeetha Natak Academy. The play 'Aravaan', included in this collection has been translated in to English, Malayalam and Kannada.

The short film Karna Motcham with his screenplay won the National Award for Best Short Film and went on to win, so far, 27 important awards in Indian and International Film Festivals.

Another short film Matraval has won three coveted awards as the best Tamil Short Film.

He has worked as Screenplay and Dialogue writer in Tamil feature films like Baba, Album, Chandaikkozhi, Unnale Unnale, Bhima, Dhaam Dhoom, Chikku Bukku, Modhi Vilaiyadu, Yuvan Yuvathi and Avan Ivan, Samar and Idam PoruL EvaL.

Rewards and recognition 

Three Doctorates and 21 M.Phil. Degrees have been awarded to scholars for researching into his writings. His books have been prescribed as part of syllabi of 2 Universities and 9 Autonomous Colleges.

Bibliography

Novels

Short stories

Plays

Children literature

Seven Lectures

Essays on World Literature

Essays on Poetry

Essays on Painting

Essays on Cinema

Anthologies of Essays

History - Non fiction

Interviews

Other books - Edited volumes

Translation

Filmography

Shortfilms

See also
 List of Indian writers

References

Video links 

Actor Rajinikanths speech at S.Ramakrishnan's felicitation function
Vairamuthu speech at S Ramakrishnan felicitation function
KARNAMOTCHAM-short film
Kokkarako-short film
Tharamaniyil Karapaanpoochigal-short film
S.Ramakrishnan speech about Dostoyevsky
S.Ramakrishnan speech about Hiroshima
Ki.Ra is a True Indian Writer - S.Ramakrishnan Speech
Karl Marx History - S.Ramakrishnan speech

External links
Official Website

Tamil screenwriters
Children's writers in Tamil
1971 births
Living people
Tamil-language writers
Recipients of the Sahitya Akademi Award in Tamil